The 2021 Texas wildfires were a series of wildfires in Texas in 2021.

List of wildfires
A total of 20,478 acres has been burned in the 2021 Texas wildfires

References 

 Tex